Tsar Teh-Yun (26 November 1905 – 10 June 2007) was a Chinese musician and poet who was among the leading guqin players of her time.

Life and career
Tsar Teh-Yun was born on 26 November 1905 in Shanghai, China. She later moved to Hong Kong with her husband and son. She became a well regarded guqin player, having been taught by Shen Caonong. Among her favorite repertoire to perform was pieces by Guo Chuwang. She was also a noted guqin teacher, and published a book on the instrument, Yinyinshi Qinpu. Tsar died on 10 June 2007 at the age of 102.

References

Sources
 

1905 births
2007 deaths
Guqin players
People's Republic of China musicians
Musicians from Shanghai